Shane Kevin Ferguson (born 12 July 1991) is a Northern Irish professional footballer who plays for Rotherham United and the Northern Ireland national team. He previously played for Newcastle United in the Premier League, where he had two spells on loan to Birmingham City of the English Championship, as well as Rangers of the Scottish Championship and Scottish Professional Football League and Millwall of the EFL Championship. He is capable of playing anywhere on the left flank as a full back or winger.

Early life
Born in Derry, Ferguson began playing youth football for his hometown club, Maiden City, and Gaelic football for Derry GAA. After finishing his GCSEs at St Mary's High School, he moved to England where he was offered a scholarship at the Newcastle United Academy.

Club career

Newcastle United
Ferguson joined the Newcastle United youth system in July 2007. In June 2009, he signed a new three-year contract.

Ferguson made his first team debut at left back on 25 August 2010, in a League Cup tie away at Accrington Stanley. He then played in the next round of the League Cup, on 22 September, away at Chelsea and he assisted in the first goal in the 4–3 win. He made his Premier League debut on 5 January 2011 against West Ham United as a second-half substitute. He made his first Premier League start against Wolverhampton Wanderers on 2 April 2011. Ferguson signed a new five-year contract on 27 May 2011, having made a good impression in the final part of the season.

A lengthy lay off due to a pre-season ankle ligament injury sustained against Darlington meant the young full back was unable to travel with the first team to a pre-season tournament in the United States. After appearing in the League Cup second round against Nottingham Forest, he made his first Premier League appearance on 10 December 2011, as a late substitute for Davide Santon.

In the early months of the 2012–13 season Ferguson assisted a number of goals for strikers Demba Ba and Papiss Cissé and produced some quality crosses from the left wing.

Loans to Birmingham City, Rangers and Millwall

In late February 2013, Ferguson joined Championship club Birmingham City on loan until 1 April. He scored his first goal for the club, and his first senior competitive goal, with a free kick from just outside the penalty area, to complete Birmingham's 4–0 away win against Crystal Palace on 29 March. His loan was extended until the end of the season, and he made 11 appearances before returning to Newcastle.

In July 2013, Ferguson rejoined Birmingham on loan for the season. He played regularly at the start of the season, but fell out of favour, and appeared only three times in the last three months of the season after the arrival of Liverpool's Jordon Ibe on loan.

Having made no first-team appearances in the first half of 2014–15, he was one of five Newcastle players to join Scottish Championship club Rangers on loan on 2 February 2015. He was still recovering from a knee ligament injury, and only regained fitness in time to make two appearances: as a second-half substitute in the first leg of the play-off final and as a starter in the second, as Rangers lost out to Motherwell.

Ferguson joined Millwall on loan on 7 August 2015 on a 92-day loan from parent club Newcastle. His debut came a day later in a 2–1 away win against Shrewsbury Town. On 1 September, Ferguson's loan spell at the club was extended until 9 January 2016. Ferguson scored his first Millwall goal in November 2015 against Colchester United. He made 24 appearances and scored 2 goals for Millwall before returning to Newcastle in January 2016.

Millwall
On 26 January 2016, Ferguson signed an eighteen-month contract with Millwall for an undisclosed fee. In May 2021, he was released from the club.

Rotherham United
On 20 July 2021, Ferguson signed a two-year contract (with the option of a third year) with Rotherham United. He made his debut in the first game of the 2021–22 season against Plymouth Argyle on 7 August 2021, coming on as a second-half substitute.

International career
Ferguson has been capped for the Northern Ireland national team at various youth levels. He made his senior debut when he came on as a substitute in a 3–0 friendly defeat to Italy on 6 June 2009. He was called up for the 2011 U21 European Championship qualifier against Germany on 13 November but did not leave the bench. Simultaneously, he had also been a regular in the U-19 squad in their bid to qualify for the 2010 European Championships and helped them to a place in the elite round. He played all three matches of that round, but Northern Ireland failed to win any of the games and finished at the bottom of their group.

In May 2011 it was reported that Northern Ireland manager Nigel Worthington believed that Ferguson would switch his allegiance to the Republic of Ireland after he failed to reply to telephone calls. In the months that followed, Ferguson did not comment on his future at international level. However, under-21 coach Steve Beaglehole later stated that he believed Ferguson never attempted to switch allegiances despite failing to respond to Worthington's calls as he had started in all the 2013 European Championship qualifiers from September onwards. In November, Ferguson ended the speculation by publicly committing his international future to Northern Ireland. On 20 February 2012 Ferguson was included in Michael O'Neill's first squad following his appointment as the Northern Ireland manager.

Ferguson scored his first goal for Northern Ireland in an international friendly versus Finland on 15 August 2012. A year later, he produced what O'Neill called "90 minutes of the really highest quality" as Northern Ireland beat Russia in a 2014 World Cup qualifier.

Career statistics

Club

International

Scores and results list Northern Ireland's goal tally first

Honours
Millwall
EFL League One play-offs: 2017

Rotherham United
League One runner-up: 2021–22
EFL Trophy: 2021–22

References

External links

Shane Ferguson profile at Irish Football Association

1991 births
Living people
Sportspeople from Derry (city)
Association footballers from Northern Ireland
Association football wingers
Newcastle United F.C. players
Birmingham City F.C. players
Rangers F.C. players
Millwall F.C. players
Rotherham United F.C. players
Premier League players
English Football League players
Northern Ireland youth international footballers
Northern Ireland under-21 international footballers
Northern Ireland B international footballers
Northern Ireland international footballers
UEFA Euro 2016 players
Gaelic footballers who switched code